Sergei Mikhailovich Ledovskikh (born 24 March 1958) is a former Russian professional footballer.

Club career
He made his professional debut in the Soviet Second League in 1980 for FC Shakhter Karagandy.

Honours
 USSR Federation Cup winner: 1988.

References

1958 births
Sportspeople from Tambov Oblast
Living people
Soviet footballers
Russian footballers
Russian expatriate footballers
Perlis FA players
Expatriate footballers in Malaysia
Russian Premier League players
FC Kairat players
FC Chernomorets Novorossiysk players
FC Zhemchuzhina Sochi players
FC Shakhter Karagandy players
Russian expatriate sportspeople in Kazakhstan
Russian expatriate sportspeople in Malaysia
Sabah F.C. (Malaysia) players
Association football midfielders